St. Anthony of Padua Church is a Roman Catholic place of worship located in Ostrołęka, Poland. Built between 1666 and 1696, it was once the central part of a large Bernardine convent. It was one of crucial points of Polish defence during the battle of Ostrołęka in 1831. Secularised in the aftermath of the January Uprising in 1864, it was taken over by the tsarist authorities of partitioned Poland and a school was moved to the former convent. It was returned to a local Catholic parish in 1927. In 1989 the building was heavily damaged by fire, but it was since restored.

Buildings and structures in Ostrołęka
17th-century Roman Catholic church buildings in Poland
Roman Catholic churches completed in 1696
1696 establishments in the Polish–Lithuanian Commonwealth